The Englewood Public School District is a comprehensive community public school district that serves students in pre-kindergarten through twelfth grade from Englewood, in Bergen County, New Jersey, United States. The district's offices are in the Administration Building at the Russell C. Major Liberty School.

As of the 2018–19 school year, the district, comprised of five schools, had an enrollment of 3,078 students and 247.0 classroom teachers (on an FTE basis), for a student–teacher ratio of 12.5:1.

Students from Englewood Cliffs attend Dwight Morrow High School, as part of a sending/receiving relationship with the Englewood Cliffs Public Schools. In 2013, the Englewood Cliffs district announced plans to consider ending the sending relationship by creating its own high school, possibly in conjunction with the Englewood Cliffs campus of Saint Peter's University.

The district participates in the Interdistrict Public School Choice Program at Dwight Morrow High School, having been approved on November 2, 1999, as one of the first ten districts statewide to participate in the program. Seats in the program for non-resident students are specified by the district and are allocated by lottery, with tuition paid for participating students by the New Jersey Department of Education. The Dwight Morrow choice program has been the state's largest.

The district is classified by the New Jersey Department of Education as being in District Factor Group "DE", the fifth-highest of eight groupings. District Factor Groups organize districts statewide to allow comparison by common socioeconomic characteristics of the local districts. From lowest socioeconomic status to highest, the categories are A, B, CD, DE, FG, GH, I and J.

Schools
Schools in the district (with 2018–19 enrollment data from the National Center for Education Statistics) are:
Preschool
D. A. Quarles Early Childhood Center with 417 students in grades PreK-K
Arlene Ng, Principal
Elementary schools
Dr. John Grieco Elementary School with 394 students in grades 1-2
Daniela Small-Bailey, Principal
McCloud School with 580 students in grades 3-5. The school had been known as Cleveland School until 2009, when it was named in memory of the district's first African-American principal, Dr. Leroy McCloud, who had a 50-year career in the district.
Dorian Milteer, Principal
Middle school
Janis E. Dismus Middle School with 563 students in grades 6-8
Lamarr Thomas, Principal
High school
Dwight Morrow High School / Academies @ Englewood with 1,063 students in grades 9-12
Joe Armental, Principal

Administration
Core members of the district's administration are:
Vacant, Superintendent
Cheryl Balletto, Business Administrator / Board Secretary

Dr. Ronel Cook, who had taken office as superintendent for the 2022-23 school year, was killed in a car crash in November 2022.

Board of education
The district's board of education, comprised of nine members, sets policy and oversees the fiscal and educational operation of the district through its administration. As a Type II school district, the board's trustees are elected directly by voters to serve three-year terms of office on a staggered basis, with three seats up for election each year held (since 2014) as part of the November general election. The board appoints a superintendent to oversee the day-to-day operation of the district.

Academic performance
 the district's averages in the Partnership for Assessment of Readiness for College and Careers (PARCC) examinations were below the averages of the State of New Jersey and of Bergen County as a whole.

References

External links 

Englewood Public School District

School Data for the Englewood Public School District, National Center for Education Statistics

Englewood, New Jersey
New Jersey District Factor Group DE
School districts in Bergen County, New Jersey